L'Atlas (born in France in 1978) is a French painter, photographer and video artist who studied calligraphy, typography and editing techniques for documentaries.

Main exhibitions

Solo exhibitions
 2007. I WAS HERE. Galerie Beaubourg, Paris.
 2008. Cosmic Graffiti. Espace Beaurepaire, Paris.
 2008. D'un monde l'autre. Galerie Il trifolio Nero, Gênes.
 2009. The way of art. ESA, Paris.
 2009. City fragments. Gallery Nine5, New York.
 2010. L'ATLAS IS HERE. Mois de la Photo Off, Galerie G, Paris.

Collective exhibitions
 2001. Street Art. Galerie du Jour, Paris.
 2004. L'invention du monde. Centre Georges Pompidou, Paris.
 2006. Ligne, Galerie Chappe, Paris
 2006. Synapses. Musée du Montparnasse, Paris.
 2007. Graphology. Palais de Tokyo, Paris.
 2009. Collection Gallizia. Grand Palais - Paris.
 2009. Né dans la rue - Graffiti. Fondation Cartier, Paris.
 2009. Etats des lieux. Galerie du jour, Paris.
 2010. Strates. Maison des Arts, Créteil.
 2011. "Gradations". Galerie Lebenson, Paris.
 2015. "The Beach Beneath the Streets". The Mine, Dubai

Performances
 2003. Maison du Japon, Venise.
 2008. Ne perds pas le nord. Fi'Art / Centre Georges Pompidou, Paris.
 2009. Surfaces actives. Art Beijing. Pékin.
 2010. Surfaces actives. Alliance Française et Cultures France.

Biennales and art fairs
 2009. Cutlog / Contemporary Art Fair. Paris.
 2009. Stroke / Urban Art Fair. Munich.
 2010. SCOPE / New York Art Show, New York.
 2010. Stroke / Urban Art Fair. Munich.
 2010. Qui Vive / Moscow International Biennale for Young Art, Moscou.
 2010. Cutlog / Contemporary Art Fair. Paris.
 2010. Biennale des arts graphiques, Musée d'Art Contemporain de Perm, Russie.
 2010. Art Kiev Contemporary Art Fair. Mistetskiy Arsenal Culture and Art Museum Complex, Ukraine.
 2011. L'ATLAS vs TANC. Alliance Française, New Delhi.

References

External links
 Official site

French contemporary artists
1978 births
Living people
Artists from Paris
French graffiti artists